William, Bill, or Billy Conway may refer to:

 William Conway (Arkansas judge) (1805–1852), Justice of the Arkansas Supreme Court
 William Conway (cardinal) (1913–1977), Irish cardinal of the Roman Catholic Church
 William Conway (Irish republican) (1902–1979), one of three Irish Republicans convicted of murder for events of the 1920 Bloody Sunday
 William Conway (United States Navy) (1802–1865), American sailor
 William A. Conway (actor) (1789–1828), English-born American actor
 William A. Conway (banker) (1910–2006), American banker
 William B. Conway (1802–1839), American lawyer and Secretary of Iowa Territory
 William C. Conway (1865–1969), American leader of a mystical Latter Day Saint sect
 William E. Conway Jr. (born 1949), American founder of the Carlyle Group, former CFO of MCI Communications
 William G. Conway (1929–2021), American zoologist
 Martin Conway, 1st Baron Conway of Allington (William Martin Conway, 1856–1937), English mountaineer, cartographer, art critic and politician
 Bill Conway (baseball) (William F. Conway, 1861–1943), American Major League Baseball player 
 Bill Conway, American singer with The Modernaires 
 Billy Conway (born 1967), English rugby league footballer
 Billy Conway (drummer), member of Treat Her Right and Morphine
 Billy Conway, a character in Accidents Happen